This is a list of computer-aided technologies (CAx) companies and their software products.
Software using computer-aided technologies (CAx) has been produced since the 1970s for a variety of computer platforms. This software may include applications for computer-aided design (CAD), computer-aided engineering (CAE), computer-aided manufacturing (CAM) and product data management (PDM).

The list is far from complete or representative as the CAD business landscape is very dynamic: almost every month new companies appear, old companies go out of business, companies split and merge. Sometimes some names disappear and reappear again.

CAx software companies

Past CAD Brands 
Acquired, orphaned, failed or rebranded.

AliasAcquired by Autodesk
AppliconAcquired by UGS Corporation
CADAMAcquired by Dassault Systèmes
CADCentreRebranded as Aveva
Baystate TechnologiesAcquired by Kubotek Corporation
BARCO NVNow called Ucamco for printed circuit board applications
CamscoAcquired by Gerber
CIS (Cambridge Interactive Systems)Acquired by Computervision
CADKEYAcquired by Baystate Technologies
CalmaAcquired by Computervision
ClarisPublished "ClarisCAD", abandoned in transition of company to FileMaker
ComputervisionAcquired by Parametric Technology Corporation
Diehl GraphsoftAcquired by Nemetschek
InvestronicaAcquired by Lectra
Matra DataVisionAcquired by Dassault Systèmes
Microdynamics Acquired by Gerber
Micro Engineering SolutionsPublished "Solution 3000" and "ADX", acquired by Autodesk
NC GraphicsAcquired by Parametric Technology Corporation
Revit Technology CorporationAcquired by Autodesk
Shape DataAcquired by Siemens
Spatial Corp.Acquired by Dassault Systèmes
SDRCAcquired by UGS Corporation
SRAC (Structural Research and Analysis Corporation) acquired by SolidWorks Corporation
SolidWorks CorporationAcquired by Dassault Systèmes
SDRC-IDEAS Acquired by Unigraphics Solutions
Unigraphics Solutions a.k.a. UGS CorporationAcquired by Siemens

In-house CAD software
Developed by companies for their own use. Some are no longer used as the organizations are now using commercial systems.

Open source CAD software projects

2D
SagCAD  Open source 2D CAD program. Maintained on SourceForge.
PythonCAD  Open source 2D CAD in Python on SourceForge.
JCAD  Open source 2D CAD in Java. Maintained on SourceForge.
RibbonSoft QCAD
Archimedes  Architectural CAD program.
LibreCAD Open source 2D CAD Program.

3D
avoCADo  Open source 3D CAD program in Java. Maintained on SourceForge. Last updated on 2013-04-26.
BRL-CAD
FreeCAD  a general purpose 3D CAD modeler, implementing Open CASCADE.
OpenSCAD
Wildcat CAD  Open source 3D solid modeler and CAD application. Not to be confused with Wildcat! BBS. Last updated in 2008.
IRIT  A solid modeling environment that allows one to model basic, primitive based models using Boolean operations as well as freeform surface's based models.
GuIrit  A graphical user interface for IRIT
SvLis  The Set-theoretic Kernel Geometric Modeller. A CSG modeller written in the C++ language and accessed through a call interface.

Open CASCADE and related projects
Open CASCADE  an SDK for 3D CAD, CAM, and CAE.
HeeksCAD  a CAD application written by Dan Heeks. The solid modelling is provided by Open_CASCADE. Maintained on Google Code.
HeeksCNC  an add-on for HeeksCAD. Maintained on Google Code.
lignumCAD  a tool for designing furniture, based on Open CASCADE and Qt. Maintained on SourceForge.
NaroCAD  a parametric modeling CAD application.
PythonOCC  Python wrappers for Open CASCADE.
FreeCAD  an open source CAD/CAE, based on Open CASCADE, Qt and Python.
SolidModeller  a parametric solid modeller. Includes a constraint based parametric sketcher. Maintained on SourceForge.
CADMAI  a commercial CAD framework, based on Open CASCADE, which can either be used as a standalone CAD application or as an integration module for 3rd party applications or SOA environments.
 Blender is a professional, free and open-source 3D computer graphics software toolset used for creating animated films, visual effects, art, 3D printed models, interactive 3D applications and video games.

PLM
OpenPLM  PLM framework based on Python (programming language) / Django (web framework), Open CASCADE, Xapian, Graphviz.

See also
List of EDA companies
Comparison of CAD software
CAD data exchange
CAD/CAM in the footwear industry

References

CAD companies, List of
CAx companies
Computer-aided manufacturing software
CAx